Thorpe's Opera House is a historic three-story building in David City, Nebraska. It was built in 1889 for William Thorpe. The facade includes arches and scallops. Inside, there is an auditorium and a balcony. Besides being used for the performing arts, the facility also hosted events with the Woman's Christian Temperance Union, fraternal organizations, political events, and high school reunions. It has been listed on the National Register of Historic Places since September 28, 1988.

References

National Register of Historic Places in Butler County, Nebraska
Buildings and structures completed in 1889
1889 establishments in Nebraska